Lake McKusick is a lake in Washington County, in the U.S. state of Minnesota.

Lake McKusick was named for John McKusick, an early settler who later became a state legislator.

See also
List of lakes in Minnesota

References

Lakes of Minnesota
Lakes of Washington County, Minnesota